"Warm It Up" is the second single released from Kris Kross' debut album, Totally Krossed Out. Produced and written by Jermaine Dupri, "Warm It Up" was released as the follow-up to the duo's multi-platinum chart topping hit, "Jump" on June 4, 1992. The song became the second consecutive top 15 hit released from the album, reaching 13 on the Billboard Hot 100, and #4 in Canada, as well as their second consecutive single to reach #1 on the Rap charts. "Warm It Up" was certified gold on August 8, 1992. In 1993 Kids Incorporated covered "Warm It Up" in the Season 9 episode "Secret Admirer". The music video was directed by Rich Murray and was awarded Best Rap Video by a new artist by Billboard Magazine in 1992

Critical reception
Steve Huey from AllMusic stated that the song "is nearly as good" as their debut single. Larry Flick from Billboard wrote, "While it's difficult to imagine anything coming close to matching the astonishing success of "Jump", this chunky pop/hip-hopper has a decent shot—mostly because it bares a remarkable resemblance to its predecessor. Attitudinal rhymes are matched with fist-waving chorus chants." People Magazine commented, "And cheek the speed at which they spin out their ragamuffin rhymes". The added, "Obviously the tongue matures before the rest of the body." Johnny Dee from Smash Hits noted the "snappy, perky rhymes with plenty of that speedy tongue-twisting rrrrrrapping".

Track listings
 CD maxi
 "Warm It Up" (Dupri's Mix) (3:53)
 "Warm It Up" (LP Version) (4:04)
 "Warm It Up" (Extended Mix) (5:56)
 "Warm It Up" (Butcher Mix) (3:49)
 "Warm It Up" (Instrumental) (3:51)

 12" maxi
 "Warm It Up" (Butcher Mix) (3:49)
 "Warm It Up" (Instrumental) (3:51)
 "Warm It Up" (LP Version) (4:04)
 "Warm It Up" (Dupri's Mix) (3:53)
 "Warm It Up" (Extended Mix) (5:56)

 7" single
 "Warm It Up" (Dupri's Mix) (3:53)
 "Warm It Up" (LP Version) (4:04)

 Cassette
 "Warm It Up" (Dupri's Mix) (3:53)
 "Warm It Up" (LP Version) (4:04)
 "Warm It Up" (Butcher's Mix) (3:49)

Charts

Weekly charts

Year-end charts

Certifications

Use of song
Chicago Cubs player Kris Bryant has used Warm It Up as his walk-up music.

The music video was also in season 2, episode 16 of Beavis and Butt-head "Lawn and Garden".

References

External links

1992 singles
1992 songs
Kris Kross songs
Ruffhouse Records singles
Song recordings produced by Jermaine Dupri
Songs written by Jermaine Dupri